Lapu-Lapu City College (LLCC) is an educational institution in Lapu-Lapu City, Cebu, Philippines. It is located at Barangay Basak and Barangay Gun-ob.

It was established through the City Ordinance No. 354-2010, designed to serve indigent students of the city by providing them access to quality and affordable education.

Academics
The college offers the following courses: 
 Bachelor of Elementary Education
 General Education
 Early Childhood Education
 Bachelor of Secondary Education
 English
 Filipino
 Mathematics 
 Social Studies
 Bachelor of Hospitality Management
 Bachelor of Science in Industrial Technology
 Computer Technology
 Electronics Technology

History
The buildings occupied by Lapu-Lapu City College was formerly used by the Department of Education Lapu-Lapu City Division. Since Department of Education (LLC) transfers to its new building, the college had occupied the space known as STEC campus through the initiative of the city government to give its citizens an affordable and quality tertiary education. LLCC - STEC Campus is currently occupied by the College Administration, College of Hospitality Management and College of Technology. The College of Education was relocated to the newly built Gun-ob Campus.

Notable Achievements

References

External links
 SunStar, 

Universities and colleges in Metro Cebu
Education in Lapu-Lapu City